Ferdinand Julius Cohn (24 January 1828 – 25 June 1898) was a German biologist. He is one of the founders of modern bacteriology and microbiology.

Ferdinand J. Cohn was born in the Jewish quarter of Breslau in the Prussian Province of Silesia (which is now Wroclaw, Poland). His father, Issak Cohn, was a successful merchant and manufacturer. At the age of 10 Ferdinand suffered hearing impairment (for an unknown reason). Starting at age 16 he studied botany under Heinrich Goppert at the University of Breslau. Due to Cohn's Jewish background he was prevented from taking the final degree examinations at Breslau. He then moved to the University of Berlin. At age 19 in 1847 he received a degree in botany at Berlin. He remained studying botany for another couple of years in Berlin, where he came in contact with many of the top scientists of his time.

In 1849 he returned to the University of Breslau and he remained at that university for the rest of his career as a teacher and researcher. On his initial return to Breslau in his early twenties, his father had bought for him a large and expensive microscope made by Simon Plössl. This microscope, which the University of Breslau and most universities did not have, was Ferdinand Cohn's main research tool in the 1850s. In the 1850s he studied the growth and division of plant cells. In 1855 he produced papers on the sexuality of Sphaeroplea annulina and later Volvox globator. In the 1860s he studied plant physiology in several different aspects. From 1870 onward he mostly studied bacteria. He established the use of sterile culture mediums and rediscovered the botanical garden of Lorenz Scholz von Rosenau in Breslau. He published over 150 research reports during his lifetime. The University of Breslau became an innovative center for plant physiology and microbiology while he was there.

Cohn was the first to classify algae as plants, and to define what distinguishes them from green plants. His classification of bacteria into four groups based on shape (sphericals, short rods, threads, and spirals) is still in use today. Among other things Cohn is remembered for being the first to show that Bacillus can change from a vegetative state to an endospore state when subjected to an environment deleterious to the vegetative state.

In 1885 he received the Leeuwenhoek Medal.

See also
Erica Tietze-Conrat
Ilse Twardowski-Conrat

References

External links

 Jewish Encyclopedia entry for Ferdinand Julius Cohn
 Ferdinand Cohn in the Encyclopedia of World Biography, published by Gale Group (2010).

1828 births
1898 deaths
German microbiologists
19th-century German botanists
19th-century German Jews
Scientists from Wrocław
People from the Province of Silesia
University of Breslau alumni
Humboldt University of Berlin alumni
Academic staff of the University of Breslau
Members of the Prussian Academy of Sciences
Members of the French Academy of Sciences
Foreign Members of the Royal Society
Leeuwenhoek Medal winners
Jewish microbiologists